The Washington Crossing Bridge, commonly known as the Fortieth Street Bridge, is an arch bridge that carries vehicular traffic across the Allegheny River between the Pittsburgh neighborhood of Lawrenceville and the suburb of Millvale.

History
Erected between 1919 and late 1924, and officially opened on December 29, 1924, the Washington Crossing Bridge was originally built to accommodate two lanes of traffic and one streetcar line. Its estimated cost upon completion was $2,344,000.

A 1982 re-decking allowed for the creation of a reversible third automobile lane.

The bridge received its name because it is located at a historically significant site pertaining to George Washington's military career. In 1753, then-Major Washington was dispatched to give French forces an ultimatum to negotiate for the return of the lands that today make up Western Pennsylvania to the British or to prepare for a military strike. Crossing the Allegheny on a wooden raft, Washington was nearly killed when his vessel overturned at this site.

See also 
List of bridges documented by the Historic American Engineering Record in Pennsylvania
List of crossings of the Allegheny River

References

External links 

Bridges over the Allegheny River
Bridges in Pittsburgh
Bridges completed in 1924
Road bridges on the National Register of Historic Places in Pennsylvania
Historic American Buildings Survey in Pennsylvania
Historic American Engineering Record in Pennsylvania
Pittsburgh History & Landmarks Foundation Historic Landmarks
National Register of Historic Places in Pittsburgh
Open-spandrel deck arch bridges in the United States
Steel bridges in the United States
Lawrenceville (Pittsburgh)